Pinopolis is an unincorporated community and census-designated place in Berkeley County, South Carolina, United States. As of the 2010 census it had a population of 948.

Demographics

History

Founded circa 1845, the community was established at a relatively high elevation in the "low country" of South Carolina, and it gave an escape from mosquitoes and uncomfortable heat. It became a gathering place for those of means during this time. It shared this aspect with other communities throughout the plantation economy of this era.

A resident spontaneously coined the name "Pinopolis" because of the many pine trees. This is probably a reflection of schooling that included references to Greek and Latin.

During the pre-Civil War period it developed in this way and maintained as a place of polish and refinement. In the post-Civil War period and during the change of the South, it became the location of the first elementary school for black students.

Because of its high elevation, Pinopolis was spared from the flooding, and now exists as a peninsula on the lake.

The Pinopolis Historic District North, Pinopolis Historic District South, and William Robertson House are listed on the National Register of Historic Places.

References

Census-designated places in South Carolina
Unincorporated communities in South Carolina
Unincorporated communities in Berkeley County, South Carolina
Populated places established in 1845